Dorval station is an inter-city train station in the city of Dorval, Quebec, Canada operated by  Via Rail. It is a stop for all Corridor trains between Toronto, Ottawa and Montreal.

North of the station building, trains call at 2 standard-level side platforms connected by an underground passageway. 
Dorval station is located directly east of the Dorval commuter rail station operated by Exo. Although the stations do not share any platforms, they and the Dorval STM bus terminus are within walking distance of one another.

A shuttle bus, known as "Air Connect", links Dorval station to Montréal–Pierre Elliott Trudeau International Airport and is free of charge to Via Rail passengers. The bus departs every 20-30 minutes from the station and takes around 20 minutes of travel time to reach door 8 on the airport departures level.

Railway services
As of June 2020, Dorval station is served by 2 domestic routes (with connections). All are provided by Via Rail, the primary passenger rail operator in Canada. Service has been reduced to 14 trains per day due to the coronavirus pandemic (effective September 1, 2020).

Quebec / Montreal - Ottawa 

 No local service between Québec City, Sainte-Foy and Charny, or Saint-Lambert and Montréal.

Montreal - Toronto Route

 No local service is provided between Dorval and Montreal or Guildwood and Toronto on these trains.

Station services
The station is staffed and offers ticket sales, wifi (in the station and business lounge), washrooms and a seating area. It is also wheelchair-accessible and has a wheelchair lift for boarding trains. 

A Via Rail business lounge is located in the northwest corner of the station, adjacent to the tracks. Services include a seating area with a selection of non-alcoholic beverages. Access is restricted to business class travellers.

References

External links

Schedules
 Ottawa - Montréal - Sainte Foy - Québec
 Québec - Sainte Foy - Montréal - Ottawa
 Montréal - Kingston - Toronto
 Toronto - Kingston - Montréal
Via Rail stations in Quebec
Railway stations in Montreal
Buildings and structures in Dorval
Transport in Dorval
Airport railway stations in Canada
Montréal–Pierre Elliott Trudeau International Airport